Seifzadeh is a surname. Notable people with the surname include:

Hossein Seifzadeh (born 1950), Iranian political scientist
Mohammad Seifzadeh (born 1948), Iranian lawyer and human rights activist